John of Trokelowe was an English chronicler and Benedictine monk of the fourteenth century. He was a monk of St Albans Abbey, and in 1294 was living in the dependent priory of Tynemouth, Northumberland. Once he was thought to be a significant chronicler, on the basis of internal evidence; it is now considered very possible that he was merely the scribe for William Rishanger.

The prior and monks endeavoured to sever connection with St Albans and to obtain independence by presenting the advowson to the king; but abbot John of Berkamsted resisted this arrangement, visited Tynemouth, and sent Trokelowe with other monks as prisoners back to St Albans. There Trokelowe wrote his  including the period 1259 to 1296 and a useful account of the reign of Edward II, from 1307 to 1323, after which date his chronicle was continued by Henry de Blaneford. A reference made by Trokelowe to the execution of Roger Mortimer shows that he was writing after 1330.

References
Riley,  in Rolls Series (London, 1866).
Hardy, Descriptive Catalogue (London, 1871)
Hunt in the Dictionary of National Biography

Notes

14th-century English historians
English chroniclers
English Benedictines
People from Tynemouth
English Christian monks
English male non-fiction writers